Tacertaenia is a genus of moths belonging to the family Tortricidae. It contains only one species, Tacertaenia polonorum, which is found in Brazil (Santa Catarina).

See also
List of Tortricidae genera

References

External links
tortricidae.com

Archipini
Monotypic moth genera
Moths of South America
Taxa named by Józef Razowski
Tortricidae genera